Gita Shahi (Nepali: गीता शाही; born February 3, 1984) is a Nepalese actress and model. Shahi is best known for her rise as Best Newcomer Actress from Nepalese Movie Bandhaki in 2005 and for her role on the television series Mod, Aparajita, Path Vrasta and Thorai Bhaye Pugi Sari. Shahi has worked in several movies such as Jungali Maya, Pandav, Kheladi, Jungali Manchey, Naina Reshnam and Newari movies like Nipho Swan, Maya Re Ratna and Matina.

Shahi has been doing modeling in several music videos, commercials, publications and fashion shows. She is an activist for the public health movement and has conducted Radio drama such as Jana Swasthya Karyakram (Public health program) from Nepalese National Radio Channel, Radio Nepal and played lead role as an actress in Thorai Bhaye Pugi Sari and Sanka, both being TV awareness series of Nepalese National TV Channel, Nepal Television. She is also known for her role as Video Jockey (VJ) in popular entertainment programs Sangeet Sandhya broadcast by Nepal Television and Rajatpat broadcast by Kantipur Television.

Early life and family 
Born in cultural city Bhaktapur, Nepal, Shahi is the daughter of Mr. Shiva Shahi and Ms. Saraswoti Shahi. She is of Nepalese descent, primarily from Newari community. Her childhood passed in care of her loving grand parents. Shahi has two older sisters and one younger brother. She started her early schooling from local school, where she completed her secondary education clearing School Leaving Certificate. During school days she used to participate actively in cultural programs. She was popular among the students and teachers. She was keenly interested in dance, which she improved over time. Her skilled dance and dedication lead her to fame in the local community. Then she started to get offers for participation in local dance and acting programs basically in cultural programs.

Career 
Shahi committed to acting professionally at the age of 17 and she started her early career as background dancer in movies. In year 2002, she won Miss Photogenic title in Mr. and Ms. Bhaktapur competition, which gave her initial publicity. With Miss Photogenic title in hand and after working in around 10 movies as background dancer, she received her first offer to work on television series Thorai Bhaye Pugi Sari and Sanka at the age of 18. Both of these series were public awareness series for improvement of family health and well being. Shanka was related to polio awareness and in Thorai Bhaye Pugi Sari, she played role of a grand daughter who not only search for her so abandoned grand parents, but also teach moral lesson to her parents for responsibilities of children towards parents. Her role was greatly appreciated by public. Shahi's good work and fame in the series became her stepping stone as an actress in Nepalese Movie Industry, also known as Kollywood. She started her career as an actress from the movie Bandaki, which was Box Office Hit and celebrated 100 days. From this first movie itself, she received the Best Newcomer Female Actress award in year 2005. The award was distrIbuted in the ceremony by His Majesty King Gyanendra Bir Bikram Shah Dev in the program organized by Film Development Board, Nepal.

With the remarkable success from the first movie itself, Shahi worked on popular Nepal Television Serial, MOD as a Lead Actress. MOD is one of the Super Hit Nepalese Serials in which she played role of Sakha. It had 75 plus episodes and is available on Youtube. She appeared from start to end in the serial as major actress. In parallel with the MOD Serial, she started to work as Lead Model in music videos. Some of the popular music videos in which she appeared were for hit songs like Affuno Maan Affai Sanga, Barta Garai Deu, K Cha Khaber Hajur Ko, Lahuray Ko Karima, Vhir Ma Chadyo Mali Gai and so forth, Chari Bhaye Auuthey Udayra being her first music video appearance.

Shahi's second movie was Pandav. She played role of a village girl who takes revenge for her family's massacre. With success as Nepalese movie actress and model, Shahi appeared on the cover of Glamour Plus Magazine, Kamana Magazine, Madhyapur Magazine and other magazines. Another television serial featuring Shahi was Aparajita which was broadcast by Nepal Television, and had 50 plus episodes. Her name in the serial was Salina. Aparajita was family drama in which she appeared from start to end as Lead Actress. With this success, she appeared in more music videos for Nepalese modern songs, Lok Dohari (folk songs) and also for bhajan songs.

Shahi's third movie was Jungali Maya in which she played Rumati, a village girl role from Raute community (Nomadic Tibeto-Burman ethnic group). Following years she played in other Nepalese movies like Jungali Manchey, Kheladi and also in several Newari movies, top three being Maya Re Ratna, Nipho Swan and Matina. In Maya Re Ratna movie, her name was Hasana as a lead artist and in Nipho Swan movie, she played as Prakriti. Jungali Manchey is Shahi's another Box Office Hit movie celebrating 51 days. The movie celebrated 51 days in popular cinema halls in Kathmandu like Guna Cinema Gwarko and Astha Narayan Pictures Kathmdandu. She appeared as guest artist in Naina Resham movie.

Shahi also worked as Video Jockey in the popular entertainment programs, Sangeet Sandhya broadcast by Nepal Television and Rajatpat broadcast by Kantipur Television. Sangeet Sandhya was entertainment program related to music, songs and music videos updates. Rajatpat was movie updates program with movie news, events, film and celebrity reports. She was adored by audience for this role too. Shahi has also successful done modeling for known & reputable brands. She promoted songs, new designs, products, clothing and services via commercials, television shows, magazine and Fashion shows. Some of the top brands which she promoted via commercials were Merina Impex related to clothing (shirting and suiting), Himal Cement related to housing and Number 1 related to Condom. She also worked on health awareness commercials related to pregnancy care and stretchers use.

Personal life 
In July 2015, Shahi married Gyanesh Buda, Software Engineer. The marriage happened in one of the holy temples in capital Kathmandu, Nepal according to Hindu rituals. Currently she is living in USA with her husband. The couple has two kid, one is a boy he is gonna be 4 years old and a baby girl she is about 6 month and half.

Contributions

Movies

Television series

Radio drama

Video jockey (VJ)

Modeling

Music video appearances

Magazine modeling

Commercials

Awards

References 

Living people
1984 births
21st-century Nepalese actresses
Nepalese film actresses
Nepalese television actresses
Actresses in Nepali cinema
Actresses in Nepali television
Nepalese female models
People from Bhaktapur